Fermín Valdés Peña (August 16, 1910 – death unknown) was a Cuban second baseman in the Negro leagues between 1931 and 1944. 

A native of Guanabacoa, Cuba, Valdés made his Negro leagues debut in 1931 with the Cuban House of David, and also played for the team once it joined the East–West League in 1932. He joined the New York Cubans in 1935. He played for New York again in 1939, and finished his career in 1944 with the Indianapolis Clowns.

References

External links
 and Baseball-Reference Black Baseball stats and Seamheads

1910 births
Place of death missing
Year of death missing
Cuban House of David players
Indianapolis Clowns players
New York Cubans players
Pollock's Cuban Stars players
Baseball infielders